Cypriots or Cypriot people may refer to:

 The inhabitants of Cyprus
 Demographics of Cyprus
 Cypriot people, or of Cypriot descent; this includes: 
Armenian Cypriots
Greek Cypriots
Maronite Cypriots
Turkish Cypriots

See also
 Cypriot (disambiguation)